The 23rd Dragoon Regiment was a French cavalry unit created in 1670 in Turin as  it was transferred to French service in 1671. It became Royal Piémont in 1690,   14e Regiment de Cavalerie in 1791 and finally 23e Regiment de Dragons in 1803. It was dissolved in 1928.

History 
The regiment was established in 1690 by the Kingdom of France as the Royal-Piémont. Before that it used to be a cavalry regiment established by the Duke of Savoy in 1670 as Prince-de-Piemont.

It became the 14th cavalry regiment in 1791 during Napoleon First Empire then was named 23rd Dragoon Regiment on 24 September 1803. It was disbanded on 14 May 1814 with the end of the Empire before being reactivated on 29 September 1873. In 1900 it was based in Vincennes.

The regiment served as horse cavalry during the First World War before being finally disbanded in 1928.

Combat 

Notable involvements from 1672 to 1918:

French Kingdom 
 Franco-Dutch War
 Nine Years' War
 War of the Spanish Succession
 War of the Polish Succession
 War of the Austrian Succession
 Seven Years' War

French First Republic
 Siege of Mainz
 Italian campaigns

French Empire
 Battle of Caldiero
 Battle of Wagram
 Battle of Borodino
 Battle of Dresden
 Battle of Leipzig
 Battle of Vauchamps

First World War 
 First Battle of Picardy
 Second Battle of the Marne

Banner 
It bears, sewed in golden letters in its layers, the following inscriptions:
 Mayence 1793
 Caldiero 1805
 Wagram 1809
 La Moskova 1812
 Dresde 1813
 Picardie 1914
 Champagne 1918

DecorationsIts tie is decorated'':
 With the Croix de Guerre 1939–1945, with 1 palm.
 Fourragère, with the colours of the Croix de Guerre ribbon, 1914–1918.

References

Sources
 
 
 
 Journal de marche du 23e Régiment de Dragons pendant la Campagne 1914-1918

External links
 23e Régiment de Dragons (Royal-Piémont)

Dragoon regiments of France
1670 establishments in France
1928 disestablishments in France
Military units and formations established in 1670
Military units and formations disestablished in 1928